Nizhny Chiamakhi (Dargwa: УбяхI ЧIигIямахьи) is a rural locality (a selo) in Kassagumakhinsky Selsoviet, Akushinsky District, Republic of Dagestan, Russia. The population was 30 as of 2010.

Geography 
Nizhny Chiamakhi is located 41 km south of Akusha (the district's administrative centre) by road, on the Karakotta River. Verkhny Chiamakhi is the nearest rural locality.

References 

Rural localities in Akushinsky District